Uwchlan Township ("above the parish") is a township in Chester County, Pennsylvania, United States. The population was 19,161 at the 2020 census.

History
Most of the settlers came from Wales. One of them, David Lloyd who was a friend of William Penn, sold large and small lots from the thousands he owned. Because the land was hilly, the Welshmen call the area Uwchlan or "Youchland," meaning Upland. 

The Lionville Historic District and Uwchlan Meetinghouse are listed on the National Register of Historic Places.

Geography

Adjacent municipalities
 Upper Uwchlan Township (north)
 West Pikeland Township (northeast)
 Charlestown Township (east)
 West Whiteland Township (southeast)
 East Caln Township (south)
 East Brandywine Township (west)

Demographics

At the 2010 census, the township was 88.8% non-Hispanic White, 2.5% Black or African American, 0.1% Native American, 5.2% Asian, and 1.4% were two or more races. 2.3% of the population were of Hispanic or Latino ancestry.

As of the census of 2000, there were 16,576 people, 5,921 households, and 4,565 families residing in the township.  The population density was 1,587.1 people per square mile (613.0/km). There were 6,030 housing units, at an average density of 577.4/sq mi (223.0/km). The racial makeup of the township was 93.67% White, 1.85% African American, 0.08% Native American, 3.24% Asian, 0.01% Pacific Islander, 0.31% from other races, and 0.86% from two or more races. Hispanic or Latino of any race were 1.24% of the population.

There were 5,921 households, of which 43.7% had children under the age of 18 living with them, 68.9% were married couples living together, 6.3% had a female householder with no husband present, and 22.9% were nonfamilies. 18.2% of all households were made up of individuals, and 3.8% had someone living alone who was 65 years of age or older. The average household size was 2.80, and the average family size was 3.24.

In the township, the population was spread out, with 30.2% under the age of 18, 5.2% from 18 to 24, 34.0% from 25 to 44, 24.1% from 45 to 64, and 6.6% who were 65 years of age or older. The median age was 36 years. For every 100 females, there were 96.5 males. For every 100 females age 18 and over, there were 92.9 males.

The median income for a household in the township was $81,985, and the median income for a family was $90,486. Males had a median income of $67,054 versus $35,658 for females. The per capita income for the township was $33,785. About 0.7% of families and 1.2% of the population were below the poverty line, including 0.3% of those under age 18 and 4.0% of those age 65 or over.

Education
Uwchlan Township is home to six schools of the Downingtown Area School District:
 Lionville Elementary School
 Shamona Creek Elementary School
 Uwchlan Hills Elementary School
 Marsh Creek Sixth Grade Center
 Lionville Middle School
 Downingtown High School East Campus

Zoned elementary schools serving sections of the township include Shamona Creek, Uwchlan, Lionville, Pickering Valley (in Upper Uwchlan Township), and East Ward (in Downingtown Borough). Most of the township is zoned to Lionville Middle School and Downingtown East High School while some of it is zoned to Downingtown Middle School and Downingtown West High School.

Transportation

The most prominent road serving Uwchlan Township is the Pennsylvania Turnpike (I-76). It crosses the northern part of the township on an east-west alignment.

Exit 312 of the Turnpike connects it to Pennsylvania Route 100 (Pottstown Pike), which runs from the southeast near Exton in West Whiteland Township to the northwest, near Eagle in Upper Uwchlan Township. Route 100 is a four-lane divided highway from West Whiteland Township to Route 113, where it becomes a six-lane divided highway to Upper Uwchlan Township.

Route 113 (Uwchlan Avenue) runs from the southwest, near Downingtown, East Caln Township and an interchange with US 30 to the northeast, near Chester Springs in West Pikeland Township. The two roads cross in the village of Lionville. Route 113 is a two-lane highway from East Caln Township to Peck Road, at which point it becomes a four-lane highway (with a center turn lane) all the way to West Pikeland Township.

The northern terminus of the Struble Trail, a multi-use rail trail, is located on Dorlan's Mill Road in the township.

See also 
 Welsh Tract

References

External links

 Uwchlan Township

Townships in Chester County, Pennsylvania
Townships in Pennsylvania
Populated places established in 1712
1712 establishments in Pennsylvania